Kendriya Vidyalaya, Puranattukara is a Kendriya Vidyalaya Sangathan school in Thrissur City under the Ministry of Human Resource Development, Government of India. Situated at the valley of the "Vilangankunnu", this institution is a pride to the Cultural Capital of Kerala. This school is the first central school in Thrissur City established in 1985. In 2010, Kendriya Vidyalaya, Ramavarmapuram was also established.

History 
Kendriya Vidyalaya, Puranattukara, took its first step in 1985 in a humble physical set-up. The school is coming under Kendriya Vidyalaya Sangathan (Chennai Region), an autonomous body under the Department of Education, Ministry of Human Resource Development Government of India. (MHRD), like all other Kendriya Vidyalayas it is primarily catering to the educational needs of the children of Central Government employees, Defense personnel, employees of the state and floating population. Affiliated with CBSE (School No : 06553 Affiliation No : 900018), New Delhi, following NCERT syllabus, with bilingual medium of instruction, this Vidyalaya is a Co-educational institution.

The Inaugural function was on 16 November 1985 by the then Chief Minister of Kerala, Shri. K Karunakaran. The Deputy Commissioner of KVS, Dr Sukumaran and
Shri. Shanmugham, Education Officer, Madras Region were also present on the occasion. The Manager of the Sitaram Mills, Punkunam was generous enough to donate the Old Building of the Sitaram Mills for the temporary working of the school and classes started in November 1985 itself. Mr. Vinod Rai, I.A.S, District Collector, Thrissur was the First Chairman of the Vidyalaya Management Committee. The efforts of the Central Government Employees Co-ordination Committee, headed by Shri. Haridas Menon marbled the backbone of the School, for providing furniture, acquiring land and other necessities towards meaningful functioning in the present building. Sri Ramakrishna Matt, had given 10 acres of their land (under lease from the State Government) to the Kendriya Vidyalaya Sangathan.

Gallery

Academics 
Kendriya Vidyalaya follows the study curriculum set by the Central Board of Secondary Education (CBSE). The school has divisions for the Primary, Secondary and Senior Secondary Sections. It is a co-educational institution, with classes from I to XII, affiliated to Central Board of Secondary Education (CBSE), New Delhi.

References

External links 
 Official Website

Kendriya Vidyalayas
Schools in Thrissur
Kendriya Vidyalayas in Kerala